Shirin Bolagh (also Romanized as Shīrīn Bolāgh) is a village in Hasanlu Rural District, Mohammadyar District, Naqadeh County, West Azerbaijan Province, Iran. At the 2006 census, its population was 92, in 23 families.

References 

Populated places in Naqadeh County